DYKS (91.9 FM), broadcasting as 91.9 Love Radio, is a radio station owned by Manila Broadcasting Company and operated by Muñoz Broadcasting Concepts. The station's studio and transmitter are located at The Penthouse, Wilrose Bldg., Burgos-Locsin St., Bacolod.

References

Radio stations in Bacolod
Love Radio Network stations
Radio stations established in 1991